Curtin College is an Australian tertiary education provider located on the main campus of Curtin University in Perth, Western Australia. The college is the integrated pathway provider to Curtin University.

Curtin College is a registered training organization under the Training Accreditation Council (WA) to run the college's Certificate IV in Foundation Studies (NTIS code 51879). The college is also registered under the Department of Education Services WA (DESWA) to run its diploma programs.

Curtin College is registered as a Higher Education Provider approved by the Australian government's Department of Education, Employment and Workplace Relations (DEEWR). As guided by the Education Services for Overseas Students (ESOS) Act 2000, Curtin College is registered on the Commonwealth Register of Institutions and Courses for Overseas Students with CRICOS Provider Code 02042G. Its registered name is Colleges of Business and Technology (WA) Pty Ltd trading as Curtin College.

Curtin College recently commenced delivering pathway programs in Certificate IV in Business, Diploma of Commerce and Diploma of Arts & Creative Industries for Curtin Singapore as well, which are taught in classrooms on the Curtin University Campus in Singapore.

History
The college started operating under its current name 'Curtin College' from August 2010 and was previously known as Curtin International College since it began in 2000. The change coincided with the college's ongoing 10-year anniversary celebrations and the change of name of its partner university from 'Curtin University of Technology' to 'Curtin University'.

Location and facilities
Curtin College is located on Building 205 on the Curtin University campus. Curtin University is Western Australia's largest university with over 44,000 students, of which 8,495 study offshore (2009). The campus is located approximately 8 kilometres to the south of the centre of Perth, Western Australia's capital city.

Curtin College students have access to many of the facilities and services on campus, including a gymnasium and fitness centre at the Curtin Stadium, which was officially opened in October 2009 by Curtin graduate and Para-Olympian Priya Cooper.

Students can access a five-story library at the centre of the campus, and the Curtin Bookshop located in the John Curtin Centre on Building 200.

Visiting chaplains from a diversity of religious orientations are active on campus. Presently these include various Christian traditions including Anglican, Baptist and Roman Catholic and other traditions such as Baha'i, Buddhist and Muslim.

Academic programs

Pre-University Level Program
Curtin College delivers the (Certificate IV) Foundation Program and Tertiary Access Program.

The Certificate IV Foundation Studies consist of eight pre-university level units studied over a period of two to three trimesters. For most courses, progression to Diploma requires a pass grade of 50% or better. However, some courses require a higher final average to progress to Diploma stage.

The Tertiary Access Program consists of four pre-university level units studied over a period of one trimester. Progression to Diploma requires a specified final average result.

University Level Program
Curtin College offers university-level diploma programs in Commerce, Arts and Creative Industries, Built Environment including Architecture, Information Technology, Engineering, Health Sciences, Humanities, Actuarial Science, and Mathematical Sciences and Finance. The diploma is equivalent to Curtin University's Year 1 Degree Program. All students who successfully complete the Curtin College Diploma and who have met the minimum academic entry requirements are guaranteed entry and advanced standing into relevant undergraduate programs at Curtin University.

Student experience and services
Curtin College has staff to support students in the adjustment to living and studying in Australia and/or to assist them in resolving problems which may affect the successful completion of studies. The college also runs a number of free workshops to help students to develop skills in key areas and improve their chances of success in studies. The content in these workshops has been specifically designed to support the academic and language skills required in the core units students are taking.

The college has recently started an Academic Peers Program. Students can seek help from a list of Academic Peers, who are fellow Curtin College students who have done well in one or more subjects (achieved 70% or more) and are willing to share their knowledge, skills and experience with other students. This means that students wanting assistance, advice or guidance in subjects are able to contact these high achieving students.

In addition to the college's strong support services, the college has a dedicated group of student leaders who organize activities on a regular basis for students. Curtin College also has a group of student mentors who actively participate in orientation programs and help students settle into campus life in their first weeks.

References

Open Universities Australia
Universities in Western Australia